Asine was an ancient Greek city of ancient Argolis, located on the coast. It is mentioned by Homer in the Catalogue of Ships in the Iliad as one of the places subject to Diomedes, king of Argos. It is said to have been founded by the Dryopes, who originally dwelt on Mount Parnassus. In one of the early wars (740 BCE) between the Lacedaemonians and the Argives, the Asinaeans joined the former when they invaded the Argive territory under their king Nicander; but as soon as the Lacedaemonians returned home, the Argives laid siege to Asine and razed it to the ground, sparing only the temple of the Pythaëus Apollo. The Asinaeans escaped by sea; and the Lacedaemonians gave to them, after the end of the First Messenian War, a portion of the Messenian territory, where they built a new town (also named Asine). Nearly ten centuries after the destruction of the city its ruins were visited by Pausanias, who found the temple of Apollo still standing.

Its site is located near the modern Tolon.

Excavations made from 1922 by Swedish archaeologists led by Axel W. Persson (and involving the then Crown Prince Gustav Adolf of Sweden) found the acropolis of ancient Asine surrounded by a Cyclopean wall (much modified in the Hellenistic era) and a Mycenaean era necropolis with many Mycenaean chamber tombs containing skeletal remains and grave goods. Excavations have continued since the 1920s almost continuously under the Swedish Institute at Athens. The site was last used as a fortified position by Italian troops during the second world war when machine gun nests were built.

See also
 List of ancient Greek cities
Swedish Institute at Athens

Sources 

 Swedish Institute at Athens - Asine, Argolid: https://www.sia.gr/en/articles.php?tid=338&page=1

References

Populated places in ancient Argolis
Former populated places in Greece
Destroyed cities
Ancient Greek archaeological sites in Greece
Cities in ancient Peloponnese
Locations in the Iliad
Mycenaean sites in the Peloponnese (region)